Asura toxodes is a moth of the family Erebidae. It is found on the Andamans.

References

toxodes
Moths described in 1907
Moths of Asia